Laugia is a genus of coelacanth fishes which lived during the Early Triassic epoch in Greenland. It contains one species, Laugia groenlandica, named by Erik Stensiö in 1932. Along with the Early Triassic Belemnocerca and the Late Jurassic Coccoderma, it forms the family Laugiidae. It can be distinguished from other laugiids by its smaller number of tail fin rays: 17–18 in the top lobe and 13–14 in the bottom lobe, compared to 21–22 in the top lobe for the other two genera. Most other coelacanths have symmetrical numbers of tail fin rays.

References

Prehistoric lobe-finned fish genera
Triassic bony fish
Fossils of Greenland